Saffron is a shade of yellow or orange, the colour of the tip of the saffron crocus thread, from which the spice saffron is derived. The hue of the spice saffron is primarily due to the carotenoid chemical crocin.

Etymology 
The word saffron ultimately derives (via Arabic) from the Middle Iranian ja'far-. The name was used for the saffron spice in Middle English from c. 1200. As a colour name, it dates to the late 14th century.

Deep saffron approximates the colour of India saffron (also known as bhagwa or kesari). 

In Rajasthani, this colour is called kay-ser-ia. The word derives its name from kesar, the Hindustani name for saffron, an important crop in Kashmir.

Religion 

The color Saffron is considered as sacred color in Hinduism. According to Hindu mythology, Saffron (or Kesariya) is the color of Sunset (Sandhya) and Fire (Agni) which symbolises sacrifice, light, and quest of salvation. The color is worn by Hindu saints and ascetics as their devotion toward the religion. Many Hindu kingdoms and dynasties had Saffron color in their flag denoting the Sanātana Dharma, including Maratha Empire.

Hinduism, Jainism and Buddhism associate saffron with the pious renunciation of material life.

Buddhist monks in the Theravada tradition typically wear saffron robes (although occasionally maroon — the color normally worn by Vajrayana Buddhist monks — is worn). The tone of saffron typically worn by Theravada Buddhist monks is the lighter tone of saffron shown above. 

Saffron holds symbolic meaning in Sikhism, representing spirit and sacrifice. Originally a shade of yellow called basanti, the field of the modern Nishan Sahib is saffron. Turbans worn by Sikhs most often are blue or white, but basanti colour is common.

Political uses 

In politics, it was used by the Indian independence movement, and it was chosen as one of the three colours of the Indian national flag after independence in 1947, and is used by Hindus. India saffron, representing courage and sacrifice, was chosen for one of the three bands of the National Flag of India, along with white (peace and truth) and what is now called India green (faith and chivalry). The Flag of India is officially described in the Flag Code of India as follows:The colour of the top panel shall be India saffron (Kesari) and that of the bottom panel shall be India green. The middle panel shall be white, bearing at its centre the design of Ashoka Chakra in navy blue colour with 24 equally spaced spokes.Sarvepalli Radhakrishnan, who later became India's first Vice President and second President, described the significance of the Indian National Flag as follows:

The use of saffron in the national flag and as political symbolism has been opposed. One line of opposition asserts that the color is sacred and should not be politicized. Another source of opposition comes from Islamists who claim the color is forbidden in Islam and strongly prohibited to be worn by the males.

Basanti turbans are associated with the Khalistan movement in the Punjab region of Pakistan and India. Even otherwise Basanti turbans are commonly used by Sikhs and not all wearing Basanti turban should be associated with separatist movement.

Because Therevada Buddhist monks were at the forefront of the 2007 Burmese anti-government protests, the uprising has been referred to as the Saffron Revolution by some in the international media.

Hindu nationalism 

The saffron flag (bhagwa dhwaj) of the medieval Hindu warrior Shivaji was held in high esteem by the Hindu Mahasabha and Rashtriya Swayamsevak Sangh (RSS) in the 1920s as a representative of Hindu resurgence and militaristic tradition. The saffron flag was the "true guru" to which Hedgewar demanded obeisance from the RSS members. "The Gerva [saffron] Flag shall be the flag of the Hindu nation. With its Om, the Swastik and the Sword, it appeals to the sentiments cherished by our race since the Vaidik [Vedic] days," he said.

The Bharatiya Jana Sangh and its successor Bharatiya Janata Party (BJP) both used saffron as their colour. The BJP used a saffron lotus on its flag, along with a green side band that possibly reflected accommodation with Islam. The Vishva Hindu Parishad (VHP), a Hindu religious body affiliated to the RSS, also used saffron as its predominant colour, with its ascetic leaders clad in saffron robes and the lay leaders wearing saffron scarves. During the Ram Janmabhoomi movement in the 1990s, the VHP and its affiliate Bajrang Dal distributed saffron flags and saffron headbands to their followers by the millions.

The predominance of the saffron symbolism in the BJP and its allies led to the BJP being referred to as the 'saffron party' in the 1990s, and the term
'saffronisation' came to be used describe the increasing influence of Hindu nationalism in party politics. This period saw phrases such as the "saffronisation of the coastal belt", "saffronisation of Karnataka" and "saffronisation of the Congress(I)".  Academic and non-academic scholars wrote books with titles involving 'saffron' to refer to Hindu nationalism: Brotherhood in Saffron, Khaki Shorts and Saffron Flags, The Saffron Wave, and The Saffron Swastika.

Clothing 
Saffron-coloured cloth had a history of use among the Gaelic-Irish. A saffron kilt is worn by the pipers of certain Irish regiments in the British Army, and the saffron léine in the defence forces of the Republic of Ireland. The latter garment is also worn by some Irish and Irish-American men as an item of national costume (though most wear kilts, believing them to be Irish). Its colour varies from a true saffron orange to a range of dull mustard and yellowish-brown hues.

The Antrim GAA teams are nicknamed "The Saffrons" because of the saffron-coloured kit which they play in. The Old Irish word for saffron, cróc, derives directly from the Latin Crocus sativus. In Ireland between the 14th and 17th centuries, men wore léinte (singular léine), loose saffron-coloured shirts that reached down to mid-thigh or the knee. (see Irish clothing).

Literature 
The colour saffron is associated with the goddess of dawn (Eos in Greek mythology and Aurora in Roman mythology) in classical literature:
Homer's Iliad:Now when Dawn in robe of saffron was hastening from the streams of Okeanos, to bring light to mortals and immortals, Thetis reached the ships with the armor that the god had given her. (19.1)Virgil's Aeneid:Aurora now had left her saffron bed,

And beams of early light the heav'ns o'erspread,

When, from a tow'r, the queen, with wakeful eyes,

Saw day point upward from the rosy skies.

Other media 

 The lyrics of Donovan's 1966 song, "Mellow Yellow" repeat the line, "I'm just mad about Saffron".
In the Pokémon franchise, in the region of Kanto there is a city named Saffron City.
The Gates is a site-specific art installation by Christo and Jeanne-Claude. The artists installed 7,503 metal "gates" along 23 miles (37 km) of pathways in Central Park in New York City. From each gate hung a flag-shaped piece of deep saffron-coloured nylon fabric. The exhibit ran from February 12, 2005 through February 27, 2005.
 Saffron Monsoon is a character in Absolutely Fabulous.

In nature 

Plants
 Byzantine meadow saffron (Colchicum × byzantinum) is a hybrid flowering plant.
 Cape saffron (Cassine peragua) is a flowering tree with saffron-coloured bark.
 Cobra saffron (Mesua ferrea) is a tree found in southern Asia.
 Meadow saffron (Colchicum autumnale) is a flowering plant found in Europe.
 Mediterranean meadow saffron (Colchicum cupanii) is a flowering plant found in central Mediterranean basin. 
 Saffron buckwheat (Eriogonum crocatum) is a species of wild buckwheat endemic to the Conejo Valley.
 Saffron spice is derived from the flowers of the plant named saffron crocus (Crocus sativus).
 Saffron plum (Sideroxylon celastrinum) is a flowering plant found in North, Central, and South America.
 Saffron thistle (Carthamus lanatus) is a thistle native to the Mediterranean basin.
 Spring meadow saffron (Colchicum bulbocodium) is a flowering alpine plant found in Europe.
 Steven's meadow saffron (Colchicum stevenii) is a flowering plant found in the eastern Mediterranean.

Birds

 The saffron-billed sparrow (Arremon flavirostris) is a bird found in South America.
 The saffron-breasted prinia (Prinia hypoxantha) is a passerine bird found in eastern South Africa and Swaziland. 
 The saffron-crested tyrant-manakin (Neopelma chrysocephalum) is a bird found in the Guianas, southern Venezuela, and the northwestern Amazon basin.
 The saffron-crowned tanager (Tangara xanthocephala) is a bird found in the montane forests of South America.
 The saffron-headed parrot (Pyrilia pyrilia) is a parrot found in the montane forests of South America.
 The saffron finch (Sicalis flaveola) is a tanager from South America, and is common in both open and semi-open areas in lowlands outside the Amazon basin.
 The saffron siskin (Spinus siemiradzkii) is a finch found in Ecuador and Peru.
 The saffron toucanet (Pteroglossus bailloni) is a toucan from South American's Atlantic Forest.

Aquatic animals 

 The saffron cod (Eleginus gracilis) is a commercially harvested fish in the North Pacific.
 The saffron-coloured clam (Tridacna crocea) is a bivalve found in the Indo-Pacific region.
 The saffron shiner (Notropis rubricroceus) is a fish found in Tennessee River drainage.

Amphibians
 The saffron-bellied frog (Chaperina fusca) is a frog found in the Malay Peninsula, Borneo, and the Philippines.

Insects

 The saffron-winged meadowhawk (Sympetrum costiferum) is a dragonfly found in North America.
 The saffron beetle (Calosoma schayeri) is a beetle found in Australia. 
 The saffron sapphire (Iolaus pallene) is a butterfly found in Africa.
 The saffron skipper (Poanes aaroni) is a skipper found in North America.

Fungi
 False saffron milkcap (Lactarius deterrimus) is a fungus found in Europe and Asia.
 Saffron milk cap (Lactarius deliciosus) is a edible fungus found in Europe.
 Saffron ringless amanita (Amanita crocea) is a Amantia found in Europe.

Viruses
The Saffron Scourge is another name for yellow fever.

See also 
Saffron, spice of the saffron crocus
History of saffron
RAL 1017 Saffron yellow
List of colours
Saffron Type System, an anti-aliased text-rendering engine

References 

Shades of yellow
Shades of orange